In 1265, the army of Baibars the Mamluk captured Haifa, destroying its fortifications, which had been rebuilt by Louis IX of France, as well as the majority of the city's homes to prevent the European Crusaders from returning.

References

Haifa
Conflicts in 1265
1265 in Asia
Battles of the Crusades
13th century in the Mamluk Sultanate
Military history of the Crusader states between the Seventh and Eighth Crusades